Paulo Sérgio Braga Madeira (born 6 September 1970) is a Portuguese former professional footballer who played as a central defender.

Club career
Madeira was born in Luanda, Portuguese Angola. A youth graduate of S.L. Benfica, he made his first-team debut in 1989–90 and, after serving a loan with fellow Primeira Liga club C.S. Marítimo, returned for another season.

After excellent displays with Lisbon neighbours C.F. Os Belenenses, Madeira was bought back by Benfica, but failed to appear regularly in his second spell with his alma mater (five years), which included a demotion to the reserves. He retired at almost 34 after brief stints with Fluminense FC and C.F. Estrela da Amadora, with the campaign ending in relegation; over the course of 13 seasons, he amassed top-division (the only competition he appeared in in his country) totals of 291 games and 12 goals.

International career
At international level, Madeira was part of the Portugal senior team that participated at UEFA Euro 1996, although he did not leave the bench. In total, he earned 25 caps and scored three goals in eight years.

Previously, Madeira was instrumental in helping the under-20 side to the 1989 FIFA World Youth Championship in Saudi Arabia, playing all the matches.

References

External links

1970 births
Living people
Angolan people of Portuguese descent
Footballers from Luanda
Portuguese footballers
Association football defenders
Primeira Liga players
S.L. Benfica footballers
C.S. Marítimo players
C.F. Os Belenenses players
C.F. Estrela da Amadora players
Fluminense FC players
Portugal youth international footballers
Portugal under-21 international footballers
Portugal international footballers
UEFA Euro 1996 players
Portuguese expatriate footballers
Expatriate footballers in Brazil
Portuguese expatriate sportspeople in Brazil